Jay Sebring....Cutting to the Truth is a 2020 American documentary film that studies Jay Sebring's life as the first international pioneer in the industry of men's style and hair.  Cited as the inspiration for Warren Beatty's character in the 1975 film Shampoo, Jay Sebring's life ended at age 35 when he and four others were killed by the Manson family in what would become known as the Tate murders.

Jay Sebring....Cutting to the Truth premiered at the 2020 Cinequest Film & Creativity Festival, where it was signed to North American streaming distribution by Shout Studios on 26 February 2020. Vice president of Shout acquisitions Jordan Fields remarked, "(Cutting to the Truth) is an intimate, fascinating portrait of a man whose legacy is so much more than how he died. It's how he lived that is the main subject here, and his profound contribution to an entire industry, as well as to the style of the 1960s, is expertly, and finally, celebrated."

Description
Jay Sebring....Cutting to the Truth was directed and produced by Sebring's nephew, Anthony DiMaria.
 With a production timeline spanning 12 years, DiMaria sought to correct nonfactual and sensational aspects of his uncle's story, in part through the documentary's extensive forensic and firsthand accounts, and also from numerous investigative interviews with Quincy Jones, David Milch, Nancy Sinatra, and others. For example, director Quentin Tarantino, interviewed at length for Cutting to the Truth, commented that, "Jay was different. He created a market where there really wasn't one. Not just a haircut, but men's hair fashion."

In a 2020 interview, Anthony DiMaria said that through his documentary he hoped to remove his uncle from the singular crime history narrative that for decades has celebrated the Manson family as "rock stars". DiMaria presents a wide spectrum of evidence that seeks to re-establish the authentic legacy of Jay Sebring's influence and accomplishments. In 2019, DiMaria told the Chicago Tribune, "The point of the documentary is to restore the face to a culturally, historically relevant individual whose identity and legacy has been stolen from him in the sensationalism of his murder." Later he would say, "It's always boggled my mind that Jay's story wasn’t told sooner".

Soundtrack
The Jay Sebring....Cutting to the Truth musical score was created by Jeff Beal, who is noted for his Blackfish documentary soundtrack, among others.

Reception

Jordan Raup of The Film Stage noted the film's revelation of Jay Sebring as a "great influence on a generation of Hollywood stars, from Marlon Brando to Bruce Lee," while USA Today included the documentary in its exclusive "All the Fall Movies You'll Want To Stream".

William Friedkin, director of The French Connection and the original Exorcist said, "Jay Sebring....Cutting to the Truth is an important, wonderful film and should be seen by as many people as possible."

Michael Ordoña in his 2020 Los Angeles Times review says the film is "stylish," an "absorbing and passionate documentary." Ordoña singles-out DiMaria for "an impressive directorial debut."

References

External links
 Jay Sebring....Cutting to the Truth on Twitter
 
 

2020 films
2020 documentary films
American documentary films
2020 directorial debut films
Films scored by Jeff Beal
2020s English-language films
2020s American films